Lin Family Ancestral Shrine is an ancestral shrine located in East District, Taichung City, Taiwan. Built in 1930, the shrine is protected as a city monument.

History 
The Lin family is a large and influential clan in the history of central Taiwan and has several subdivisions spread throughout the area, most notably Wufeng Lin family. The original ancestral shrine was located in current-day Dali District. The founding date of this shrine is unknown: a 1952 stone engraving inside the shrine claims that it was during the reign of Jiaqing Emperor, while a 1934 Japanese-era newspaper claims that its 1775. Beginning in 1895, the shrine was moved multiple times; the current shrine's construction lasted between 1918 to 1930.

On November 27, 1985, the Taichung City Government protected the shrine as a city monument.

Architecture 
The Lin Family Ancestral Shrine was designed by Chen Yingshan (陳應杉) and built with the traditional Hokkien architectural style. The halls are arranged in siheyuan layout with halls that divide the center space into seven courtyards of various sizes. Its walls are made of brick that is structurally reinforced by wooden supports on the inside. Sculptures and paintings decorate the shrine to signify the wealth of the Lin family. Since it was built in the Japanese era, Japanese and European materials and techniques are also visible in the shrine.

Gallery

See also 
 Chinese ancestral veneration
 List of temples in Taichung
 List of temples in Taiwan
 Zhang Family Temple
 Zhang Liao Family Temple

References 

1930 establishments in Taiwan
Religious buildings and structures completed in 1930
Temples in Taichung
Ancestral shrines in Taiwan